Pura, officially the Municipality of Pura, is a 4th class municipality in the province of Tarlac, Philippines. According to the 2020 census, it has a population of 25,781 people.

Geography
The municipality of Pura is located at the northeastern part of the Province of Tarlac, surrounded by the municipalities of Ramos (about 5 km to the north), Victoria (6.5 km to the south), Gerona (6 km to the west), and Guimba in Nueva Ecija (14 km to the east).

Pura has a total land area  which represents 1.02% of the entire provincial area. It comprises 16 barangays of which barangays Poblacion 1, 2, and 3 are considered urban area and the rest are considered rural. The land area per barangay is shown in the table below.

It is one of the exits of the Tarlac–Pangasinan–La Union Expressway (TPLEX).

Topography
The Municipality of Pura is plain, slope-less.

The soil series of Pura are light brownish gray to heavy black granular surface soil. When dry, they are hard and compact and break into big clogs. The subsoil is brownish to nearby black columns to coarse granular clay loam. The municipality of Pura has two (2) distinct soil types: Luisita fine sand loam and Pura clay loam.

Climate

Pura, just like any other town in the province of the Tarlac has two (2) pronounced seasons. The wet season that starts from May up to lasts up to September and dry from the month of October to April. This type of climate is typically hot, humid, and tropical and is generally affected by the neighboring topography and prevalent wind direction that varies within the year. Tropical monsoon is carried into the area from the southeast in the month of May to September thereby causing heavy rainfall in the area. Most of the rainfalls are associated with typhoons.

Barangays
Pura is politically subdivided into 16 barangays.

 Balite
 Buenavista 
 Cadanglaan 
 Estipona 
 Linao 
 Maasin 
 Matindeg 
 Maungib 
 Naya 
 Nilasin 1st 
 Nilasin 2nd 
 Poblacion 1 
 Poblacion 2 
 Poblacion 3 
 Poroc 
 Singat

Demographics

Economy 

Income: P 40,212,387.83 (2009)
GDP: approx. US$20 Million 
Per capita: P1,800.00
Major sources of livelihood: Agriculture and Livestock, SME-Retailing

Education

Municipality of Pura consists of 4 public secondary schools, 1 private secondary school, 15 public primary and elementary schools, and 4 private elementary schools namely:

Public secondary schools:
Buenavista High School
Estipona National High School
Maungib High School
Pura Central High School (former Estipona High School Annex)
Private secondary school:
Pura Academy Inc.
Public primary and elementary schools:
Buenavista ES
Don Quirino Sulit ES
Dona Felisa Y. Sawit ES
Don Teodorico Pascual PS
Estipona ES
Linao ES
Maasin ES
Matindeg ES
Maungib ES
Naya PS
Nilasin 1st ES
Poroc ES
Pura Community School
Pura Central Elementary School (where the district office is located)
Singat ES
Private elementary schools:
Amazing Grace Christian Academy Inc.
Progressivist School of Buenavista Inc.
Pura United Methodist Church Learning Center Inc.
St. Antoninus Catholic School

Sister cities
 Quezon City

References

External links

Pura Profile at PhilAtlas.com

Pura, Tarlac
[ Philippine Standard Geographic Code]
Philippine Census Information

Municipalities of Tarlac